The economy of Gibraltar consists largely of the services sector. While part of the European Union until Brexit, the British overseas territory of Gibraltar has a separate legal jurisdiction from the United Kingdom and a different tax system.
The role of the UK Ministry of Defence, which at one time was Gibraltar's main source of income, has declined, with today's economy mainly based on shipping, tourism, financial services, and the Internet (mostly gambling).

As of 2020, Brexit represents a major uncertainty for the Gibraltar economy.

Shipping

Bunkering
Gibraltar is one of the largest bunkering ports in the Mediterranean Sea, with 4.3 million tonnes of bunkers delivered in 2007. This has become the main activity within the Port of Gibraltar.

Finance
Until Brexit Gibraltar was a constituent part of the European Union as a Special Member State territory, having joined the European Economic Community with the United Kingdom in 1973, under the provisions of the Treaty of Rome relating to European dependent territories. However, it is exempt from the Common external tariff, the Common Agricultural Policy and the requirement to levy Value added tax.

Financial institutions operating in Gibraltar are regulated by the Gibraltar Financial Services Commission.
Gibraltar has a functioning stock exchange, the Gibraltar Stock Exchange.

Subject to notifying the EU Commissioner, who must be satisfied that they meet certain criteria in accordance with the relevant EU Directive, Gibraltar-licensed or -authorised financial institutions can provide services throughout the EU and European Economic Area without having to seek separate licences or authorisation in the host Member State. This is known as the passporting of financial services.

In December 2008 in a landmark decision the European Court of Justice ruled that:

This allowed the implementation of a new low tax system which took full effect in 2010.

Referred to as an International Finance Centre, Gibraltar was among 35 jurisdictions identified by the Organisation for Economic Co-operation and Development (OECD) as a tax haven in June 2000. However, the list's disclaimer states:

As a result of having made a commitment in accordance with the OECD's 2001 Progress Report on the OECD's Project on Harmful Tax Practices, Gibraltar is not included in the OECD's list of uncooperative tax havens. It has also never been listed on the FATF Blacklist of uncooperative countries in the fight against money laundering. It may also be referred to as an offshore financial centre, by international institutions such as the International Monetary Fund (IMF).

However, in its April 2009 progress report, the OECD listed Gibraltar in the list of jurisdictions which, although committed, had not "substantially implemented" yet the internationally agreed tax standard. Following Gibraltar's signing of 12 additional Tax Information Exchange Agreements (TIEAs), as of October 2009, with jurisdictions including the UK, US and Germany, to sum 13, Gibraltar is currently listed in the OECD "white list", and is considered a jurisdiction that has substantially implemented the tax standard. It therefore shares the same status as OECD member states such as the UK, the US, Spain or Germany.

Fiscal advantages, including no tax on capital income, are offered to a maximum of 8,464 offshore qualified companies incorporated in Gibraltar. After an agreement with the European Union in 2005, this tax exempt regime is due to disappear on 31 December 2010.

A 2007 IMF report on the regulatory environment and anti-money laundering has once again endorsed Gibraltar's robust regulatory environment.

According to the report:

In 2008 Gibraltar was listed for the first time in the Global Financial Centres Index published by the City of London Corporation. The Rock was ranked 26th in a list of 69 leading finance centres around the world based on an online survey of 1,236 business professionals, who provided a total of 18,878 assessments. In the most recent GFCI report of 2011, Gibraltar was ranked 63rd in the world, and 8th of the leading offshore financial centres (OFCs).

The Tax Justice Network ranked Gibraltar at #43 out of 71 jurisdictions on its 2011 Financial Secrecy Index. Gibraltar's "secrecy score" was 78, equating to Switzerland in that category.

Gibraltar was also ranked in the top 20 centres for e-readiness, coming 20th after major capitals and leading offshore centres.

Tourism

Manufacturing
The territory also has a small manufacturing sector, with one company (Bassadone Automotive Group) supplying ambulances and other project vehicles converted locally from SUV vehicles to the United Nations and other agencies, employing some 320 staff across its range of activities.

Internet business
Gibraltar offers a favourable tax system, good internet connectivity along with a well-developed regulatory system. All gambling operations in Gibraltar require licensing under the Gambling Act 2005. The Gibraltar Regulatory Authority is the Gambling Commissioner under the Gambling Act 2005, and therefore the regulatory body. Good  regulation, and being part of the EU is seen as a strong advantage by large legitimate operators. The UK has published plans to protect online gamblers from crime and exploitation by banning gambling adverts from poorly regulated countries which specifically mention Gibraltar as an approved location.

Defence spending
The UK's Ministry of Defence was originally the mainstay of Gibraltar's economy but this has greatly reduced to around 6% of the gross domestic product. In 2006 the Ministry of Defence announced that the provision of services to the military base would be contracted to make further cost savings. This was finalised in January 2007.

Economy in detail

Gibraltar benefits from an extensive shipping trade, a well regulated international finance center, tourism, and has become a global leader in the virtual gaming industry.

Self-sufficient Gibraltar benefits from an extensive shipping trade, offshore banking, and its position as an international conference center. The British military presence has been sharply reduced and now contributes about 7% to the local economy, compared with 60% in 1984. The financial sector, tourism (almost 5 million visitors in 1998), shipping services fees, and duties on consumer goods also generate revenue. The financial sector, the shipping sector, and tourism each contribute 25%-30% of GDP. Telecommunications accounts for another 10%. In recent years, Gibraltar has seen major structural change from a public to a private sector economy, but changes in government spending still have a major impact on the level of employment.

Figures from the CIA World Factbook show the main export markets in 2006 were United Kingdom 30.8%, Spain 22.7%, Germany 13.7%, Turkmenistan 10.4%, Switzerland 8.3%, Italy 6.7% while the corresponding figures for imports are Spain 23.4%, Russia 12.3%, Italy 12%, UK 9%, France 8.9%, Netherlands 6.8% and United States 4.7%.

The Gibraltar Government state that economy grew in 2004/2005 by 7% to a GDP of £599,180,000. Based on statistics in the 2006 surveys, the Government statisticians estimate it has grown by 8.5% in 2005/6 and by 10.8% in 2006/7 and that the GDP is probably now around 730 million. Inflation was running at 2.6% in 2006 and predicted to be 2% to 3% in 2007. Speaking at the 2007 budget session, Peter Caruana, the Chief Minister said "The scale of Gibraltar's economic success makes it one of the most affluent communities in the entire world."

Labour force:
12,690 (including non-Gibraltar labourers) (2001)

Labour force - by occupation:
services 60%, industry 40%, agriculture NEGL%
Unemployment rate
2% (2001)

Budget
revenues: $455.1 million
expenditures: $423.6 million (2005 est.)

Public debt
15.7% of GDP (2005 est.)

Industries
tourism, banking and finance, ship repairing, tobacco

Industrial production growth rate
NA%

Electricity - production
142 million kWh (2006 est.)

Electricity - production by source

fossil fuel
100%

hydro
0%

nuclear
0%

other
0%

Electricity - consumption
142 million kWh (2006 est.)

Electricity - exports
0 kWh (1998)

Electricity - imports
0 kWh (1998)

Oil - production
 (2001 est.)

Oil - consumption
 2001

Oil - exports
NA (2001)

Oil - imports
NA (2001)

Agriculture - products
none

Exports
$271 million (2004 est.)

Exports - commodities
(principally reexports) petroleum 51%, manufactured goods 41%, other 8%

Exports - partners
UK, Morocco, Portugal, Netherlands, Spain, US, Germany

Imports
$2.967 billion (2004 est.)

Imports - commodities
Fuels, manufactured goods, and foodstuffs

Imports - partners
UK, Spain, Japan, Netherlands

Fiscal year
1 July - 30 June

The above figures taken from the CIA World Factbook September 2009 edition.

Interaction with the nearby area
In September 2009 the Gibraltar Chamber of Commerce released an Economic impact study and analysis of the economies of Gibraltar and the Campo de Gibraltar produced by Professor John Fletcher of Bournemouth University. The report aimed at clarifying the effects of Gibraltar's economy on the Campo area. It demonstrated that Gibraltar's economy has a significant and very positive economic impact on the Campo de Gibraltar. It also noted that the Campo region played a "significant role [..] in Gibraltar's economic development as well", concluding that "[b]oth economies and societies would be the poorer without the other..."

Its conclusions were:

Taxation

Various economic indicators by national origin 
The average annual earnings of Indo-Gibraltarians is nearly twice that of the rest of Gibraltarian people and approximately 1.5 times that of immigrants in the UK, thus making people of Indian descent by far the most economically affluent ethnic group in Gibraltar.

References

External links

The Gibraltar Government website
The Financial Services Commission
The Gibraltar regulatory authority
Government revenue and expenditure 2006 - pdf

 
Gilbratar